There are a few places named Platteville in the United States:

Platteville, Colorado
Platteville, Wisconsin, a city
Platteville (town), Wisconsin
Platteville Atmospheric Observatory Ionospheric heating facility